William Derby (fl. 1397) was a Member of Parliament for Southwark in 1397.

References

14th-century births
15th-century deaths

Year of birth unknown
Year of death unknown
14th-century English people
Members of the Parliament of England (pre-1707)
People from Southwark